Valeriy Zhogolko is a retired Ukrainian professional footballer who played as a defender.

Career
Zhogolko started his career in 1995 with Cheksyl Chernihiv, moving between several lower-level clubs in the years that followed. In 1999 he moved to Desna Chernihiv in the Ukrainian Second League for one season before ending his peripatetic career at FC Nizhyn in 2006.

Honours
Nizhyn
 Chernihiv Oblast Football Championship: 2004, 2006
 Chernihiv Oblast Football Cup: 2000, 2001, 2003, 2004

References

External links 
 Valeriy Zhogolko at footballfacts.ru

1974 births
Living people
Footballers from Chernihiv
SDYuShOR Desna players
FC Desna Chernihiv players
FC Cheksyl Chernihiv players
FC Elektron Romny players
Ukrainian footballers
Ukrainian Premier League players
Ukrainian First League players
Ukrainian Second League players
Association football defenders